Yao Zhikui (born February 7, 1991) was a Chinese mixed martial artist who competed as a Flyweight for the Ultimate Fighting Championship.

Background
Originally Henan Province of Central China, Yao competed in wrestling and trained in Sanda before moving to Beijing in order to pursue a career in professional mixed martial arts. Yao began training under the tutelage of former UFC Lightweight Zhang Tiequan.

Mixed martial arts career

Early career
Yao made his professional debut in 2012, and compiled a record of 1 - 1, before getting the opportunity to appear on The Ultimate Fighter.

The Ultimate Fighter: China
In the fall of 2013, it was announced that Yao had been selected as one of the bantamweight participants for Team Sky Dragons on the inaugural season of The Ultimate Fighter: China.

In his first fight, Yao faced Allen Chong. He won the fight via knockout in the first round.

In the semifinal fight, Yao faced off against Yang Jianping. He lost the fight via unanimous decision and was subsequently eliminated from the competition.

Ultimate Fighting Championship
Yao made his promotional debut on August 23, 2014 in a flyweight bout against Royston Wee at UFC Fight Night 48. He lost the fight via split decision.

Yao faced Nolan Ticman on May 16, 2015 at UFC Fight Night 66. He won the fight via split decision.

Yao next faced Fredy Serrano on November 28, 2015 at UFC Fight Night 79. He lost the fight via TKO in the first round after Yao severely injured his arm while trying to defend a takedown.

Yao was expected to face promotional newcomer Jenel Lausa on October 15, 2016 at UFC Fight Night 97. However, the promotion announced on October 6 that they had cancelled the event entirely. In turn, the pairing was quickly rescheduled and is expected to take place on November 27, 2016 at UFC Fight Night 101. He lost the fight via unanimous decision.

Mixed martial arts record

|-
|Loss
|align=center| 3–5
|Augustin Delarmino Jr.
|TKO (punches)
|CKF Macau
|
|align=center| 2
|align=center| N/A
|Macau
|
|-
|Win
|align=center|3–4 
|Swapnil
|TKO (punches)
|CKF 115
|
|align=center|1
|align=center|1:44
|Xiangxi, China
| 
|-
|Loss
|align=center| 2–4
|Jenel Lausa
|Decision (unanimous)
|UFC Fight Night: Whittaker vs. Brunson
|
|align=center| 3
|align=center| 5:00
|Melbourne, Australia
|  
|-
|Loss
|align=center|2–3
|Fredy Serrano
|TKO (arm injury)
|UFC Fight Night: Henderson vs. Masvidal
|
|align=center|1
|align=center|0:44
|Seoul, South Korea
|
|-
|Win
|align=center|2–2 
|Nolan Ticman
|Decision (split)
|UFC Fight Night: Edgar vs. Faber
|
|align=center|3
|align=center|5:00
|Pasay, Philippines
|
|-
|Loss
|align=center|1–2
|Royston Wee
|Decision (split)
|UFC Fight Night: Bisping vs. Le
|
|align=center|3
|align=center|5:00
|Macau, SAR, China
|
|-
| Win
|align=center| 1–1
| Doayuan Wang
| Submission (arm-triangle choke)
| RUFF 9
| 
|align=center| 1
|align=center| 0:37
| Sanya, China
|
|-
| Loss
|align=center| 0–1
| Takayuki Iijima
| N/A
| Real Fight MMA Championship 1
| 
|align=center| N/A
|align=center| N/A
|Zhengzhou, China
| 
|-

See also
 List of male mixed martial artists

References

External links
 

1991 births
Living people
Sportspeople from Henan
Flyweight mixed martial artists
Mixed martial artists utilizing sanshou
Mixed martial artists utilizing Shuai Jiao
Chinese male mixed martial artists
Ultimate Fighting Championship male fighters
Chinese sanshou practitioners
Chinese male sport wrestlers